Gnomibidion biacutum is a species of beetle in the family Cerambycidae. It was described by Martins in 1968.

References

Neoibidionini
Beetles described in 1968